Duka is a village in Vas County, Hungary.

Famous people
The poet Judit Dukai Takách was born in Duka in 1795. Zádor György was born there in 1799.
Others have even taken the name of their village as their surname.

References

External links 
 Street map (Hungarian)

Populated places in Vas County